Ludd can refer to:
 Ned Ludd, inspiration for the Luddite movement
 Lludd Llaw Eraint, figure in Welsh mythology
 Nuada, figure in Irish mythology
Short for Luddite on the TV show Upload

See also
 Lud (disambiguation)
 Lod, a city in Israel (formerly Lydda)